The Haga Echo Temple (Swedish: Ekotemplet) was built in 1790 as a summer dining room for Gustav III who loved to dine outdoors. It is situated in Hagaparken in Solna just north of Stockholm. The architect was Carl Christoffer Gjörwell.

References 
SFV Statens Fastighetsverk - Hagaparken

Metropolitan Stockholm
Government buildings completed in 1790
1790 establishments in Sweden

de:Hagapark#Der Echotempel